Momordicin is one of several compounds found in the bitter melon vine, including:
 Momordicin I, a chemical compound found in the leaves
 Momordicin II
 Momordicin-28

See also 
 Momordicinin
 Momordicilin
 Momordenol
 Momordol

References